The Echiniscidae are a family of tardigrades, a phylum of water-dwelling, eight-legged, segmented micro-animals. It is one of the four families in the order Echiniscoidea. The family was named by Gustav Thulin in 1928.

Genera 
The family Echiniscidae consists of the following genera:

 Acanthechiniscus Vecchi, Cesari, Bertolani, Jönsson, Rebecchi & Guidetti, 2016
 Antechiniscus Kristensen, 1987
 Bryochoerus Marcus, 1936
 Bryodelphax Thulin, 1928
 Cornechiniscus Maucci & Ramazzotti, 1981
 Diploechiniscus Vicente, Fontoura, Cesari, Rebecchi, Guidetti, Serrano & Bertolani, 2013
 Echiniscus Schultze, 1840
 Hypechiniscus Thulin, 1928
 Mopsechiniscus Du Bois-Reymond Marcus, 1944
 Multipseudechiniscus Schulte  Miller, 2011
 Novechiniscus Kristensen, 1987
 Parechiniscus Cuénot, 1987
 Proechiniscus Kristensen, 1987
 Pseudechiniscus Thulin, 1911
 Testechiniscus Kristensen, 1987

References 

 
Tardigrade families